Bolesław Kwiatkowski (28 July 1942 – 13 February 2021) was a Polish basketball player. He competed in the men's tournament at the 1968 Summer Olympics.

References

External links
 

1942 births
2021 deaths
Polish men's basketball players
1967 FIBA World Championship players
Olympic basketball players of Poland
Basketball players at the 1968 Summer Olympics
Basketball players from Warsaw